Indonesian National Route 7 connects Lohbener and Cirebon. It goes parallel with Indonesian National Route 1.

Route
Lohbener - Indramayu - Karangampel - Gunung Jati - Cirebon

References

7
Transport in West Java